Steven Elliot Grosby is Professor of Religion at Clemson University.

Education 
Grosby received his PhD from the Committee on Social Thought of the University of Chicago.

Career 
Grosby's areas of research include the ancient Near East, the Hebrew Bible, the relation between religion and nationality, and Social and Political Philosophy.

His articles have appeared in journals such as Zeitschrift fur die alttestamentliche Wissenschaft, History of Religions, Journal of the Economic and Social History of the Orient, Archives Europeennes de Sociologie, and Nations and Nationalism.

“Grosby asserts that the human tendency to form attachments to the image of the native land. . . suggests something fundamental about human conduct.” 

In his book Biblical Ideas of Nationality: Ancient and Modern, Grosby argues that the ideas of modern nationhood  were already present in  the Ancient Near East in places like Armenia, Edom,  Egypt, and especially Biblical Israel, which later became the major model for European nation formation.

According to Anthony D. Smith, Grosby argues that “from roughly the late seventh century BCE… Israel appears as a fully fledged nation.”

Selected publications

 Biblical Ideas of Nationality: Ancient and Modern (2002)
 Hans Freyer, Theory of Objective Mind: An Introduction to the Philosophy of Culture. Series in Continental Thought No. 25 (translation of Theorie des objektiven Geistes. Eine Einleitung in die Kulturphilosophie", 1923) (1998)
 Editor of  two volumes of selected writings of Edward Shils, The Virtue of Civility (1997) and The Calling of Education (1997)
 Nationality and Nationalism—a four volume Reader'', co-editor (2004)
 Nationalism: A Very Short Introduction Oxford University Press (2005)

Awards and honors
Templeton Foundation Award

References

Additional sources 
 

Clemson University faculty
University of Chicago alumni
Scholars of nationalism
Living people
1951 births